Robert Cortez Scott (born April 30, 1947) is an American lawyer and politician serving as the U.S. representative for  since 1993. A member of the Democratic Party, he is the dean of Virginia's congressional delegation and the first Filipino American voting member of Congress. The district serves most of the majority-black precincts of Hampton Roads, including all of the independent cities of Franklin, Newport News (where he resides) and Portsmouth, parts of the independent cities of Chesapeake, Hampton, Norfolk and Suffolk and all of Isle of Wight County. From 2019 to 2023, Scott was chair of the House Education and Labor Committee. He has been ranking member on that committee since 2023.

Early life, education and legal career
Scott was born in Washington, D.C., and grew up in Newport News, Virginia. He is of African American and Filipino descent. His father, Charles Waldo Scott, was a pioneering African American surgeon and in 1952 became the first African American appointed to the Newport News school board in the 20th century. Scott's mother Mae Hamlin-Scott, a graduate in chemistry of the University of Michigan, was an educator who taught science in the Newport News public schools.

Scott graduated from Groton School in 1965. He received his B.A. in government from Harvard College in 1969 and his Juris Doctor from Boston College Law School in 1973. He is a member of Alpha Phi Alpha fraternity.

Scott is a former member of the Massachusetts Army National Guard (1970–73) and Army Reserve (1974–76). He was a lawyer in private practice in Newport News from 1973 to 1991.

Virginia legislature
Scott was elected to the Virginia House of Delegates as a Democrat in 1977 and to the Senate of Virginia in 1982, after a census-based reapportionment changed district numbers (thus, his nominal predecessors were in fact representatives from Northern Virginia). In the Virginia legislature, Scott worked to allow the poor and children greater access to health care, as well as to increase the minimum wage, and increase job training. He also authored legislation providing tax credits to business that provide donations to serving local communities in preventing crime or improving social service delivery.

U.S. House of Representatives

Elections

1986
He lost to Republican incumbent Herb Bateman, 56%-44%.

1992
In 1992, the Department of Justice directed the Virginia legislature to draw a black-majority district after the 1990 census. The legislature responded by shifting most of the black residents of Hampton Roads and Richmond into a newly created 3rd district. Scott won a three-way Democratic primary with 67% of the vote, which was tantamount to election in this heavily Democratic district. In the general election, he defeated Republican Dan Jenkins 79%-21%.

1994-2008
During this period, Scott was reelected every two years with at least 76% of the vote, except in 2004. That year, he was challenged by Republican Winsome Sears, a former State Delegate. He won with 69% of the vote, now the second-lowest winning percentage of his career. In 1994, Scott won 79.44% of the vote, defeating Republican Thomas E. Ward. In 1996, he won 82.12% of the vote, defeating Republican Eisle G. Holland. In 1998, he won 75.97% of the vote, defeating Independent Robert S. Barnett. He ran unopposed in 2000, 2002, 2006, and 2008.

2010

Scott defeated Republican Chuck Smith, a former JAG, 70%-27%.

2012

After redistricting, Scott's district was made even safer; he picked up all of Portsmouth and Newport News, as well as Petersburg. In 2008, President Barack Obama had carried the district with 76% of the vote; Scott won the new district with 78%, defeating Air Force officer Dean Longo. He easily won an 11th term with 81.26% of the vote.

Scott joined Obama in kicking off his campaign at Virginia Commonwealth University. The focus of the rally was largely on Obama's timeline for leaving the Middle East.

2016

The 3rd was reconfigured as a result of a court-ordered redistricting in 2015. It lost its territory in and around Richmond to the neighboring 4th district, but the new 3rd was no less Democratic than its predecessor.

Scott defeated Republican Marty Williams, 66%-33%, the lowest winning percentage of his career.

Tenure

Scott is the first African American Representative from Virginia since Reconstruction. Also, having a maternal grandfather of Filipino ancestry makes Scott the first American of Filipino descent to serve as a voting member of Congress. His congressional district is the only one with a majority black population in Virginia. It was created in 1992 and has remained the state's most Democratic district.

Scott's annual Labor Day picnic, usually held at his mother's residence in Newport News, is a major campaign stop for statewide and federal candidates in Virginia.

On November 7, 2009, Scott voted for the Affordable Health Care for America Act (HR 3962).

Scott has voted progressively in the House. He has supported increases in the minimum wage and has worked to eliminate anti-gay bias in the workplace. In 2010, Scott co-sponsored the "Lee-Scott bill" with Barbara Lee to make it easier on individuals who had been on unemployment for 99 weeks without finding work. Of the bill, Lee said, "it is important that we put in place a safety net for those still looking for work. We cannot and will not allow our fellow Americans to fall by the wayside. Congressman Scott and I plan to continue to push for passage of this legislation because it is simply the right thing to do."

Scott supports LGBT rights. In 2009, he voted in favor of the Matthew Shepard and James Byrd Jr. Hate Crimes Prevention Act, a bill that expanded the federal hate crime law to cover crimes biased by the victim's sexual orientation or gender identity. In 2010, he voted in favor of the Don't Ask, Don't Tell Repeal Act. In 2019, Scott voted in favor of the Equality Act, a bill that would expand the federal Civil Rights Act of 1964 to ban discrimination based on sexual orientation and gender identity, and urged Congress members to support the legislation.

Scott was an outspoken opponent of the Bush administration. He opposed the Patriot Act, explaining that officials could abuse the power by promoting anti-terrorist security and develop unfair "racial profiling". In 2002 Scott voted against the Iraq war resolution and did not support any of the Bush Doctrine in reference to the Iraq war.

For his tenure as the chairman of the House Education and Labor Committee in the 116th Congress, Scott earned an "A" grade from the nonpartisan Lugar Center's Congressional Oversight Hearing Index.

Legislation sponsored
Scott introduced the Death in Custody Reporting Act of 2013 (H.R. 1447; 113th Congress) on April 9, 2013. The bill would require the United States Department of Justice to collect data from U.S. states and territories about the deaths of prisoners in their custody.  States and territories would face monetary penalties for noncompliance. It would also require federal agencies to report on the deaths of prisoners in their custody.

Committee assignments
 Committee on Education and Labor (ranking member)

Caucuses
 Congressional Asian Pacific American Caucus
 Congressional Black Caucus
 Congressional Arts Caucus
 Congressional Cement Caucus
Climate Solutions Caucus
Medicare for All Caucus

U.S. Senate speculation
When then-presumptive Democratic presidential nominee Hillary Clinton selected Tim Kaine, a U.S. Senator from Virginia, as her running mate in July 2016, speculation arose about who would be nominated to replace Kaine in the Senate should the ticket win. In August 2016, former Democratic Governor of Virginia Douglas Wilder stated that he would want Governor Terry McAuliffe to appoint Scott to the seat, stating that it "would be good for the commonwealth, good for the Democratic Party, of which Bobby has been most supportive, and great for our nation." On November 8, Clinton and Kaine lost the election and Kaine remained in his Senate seat.

Controversies

2017 sexual harassment allegation
On December 15, 2017, Marsheri Everson (also known as M. Reese Everson), a former congressional fellow who had worked in Scott's office, alleged that Scott had sexually harassed her in 2013, touching her on the knee and back on separate occasions, then propositioning her with an inappropriate relationship after asking, "if you travel with me, are you going to be good?" Scott strongly denied Everson's claim.

Everson was represented by two attorneys, one Jack Burkman, known for his involvement in the conspiracy theories surrounding the murder of Seth Rich as well as his alleged involvement in a scheme to pay women to lie about sexual harassment claims against special counsel and former FBI Director Robert Mueller.

Everson's case against Scott is ongoing.

Knowledge of sexual assault allegations against Justin Fairfax
Scripps professor Vanessa C. Tyson alleged in 2019 that Virginia Lieutenant Governor Justin Fairfax sexually assaulted her in 2004 and approached Scott, a longtime friend, about these allegations between the time of Fairfax's election in November 2017 and inauguration in January 2018; The Washington Post also contacted Scott about the allegations. In a 2019 statement, Scott said, "Allegations of sexual assault need to be taken seriously. I have known Professor Tyson for approximately a decade and she is a friend. She deserves the opportunity to have her story heard."

Electoral history

Write-in and minor candidate notes:  In 1986, write-ins received 9 votes.

*Write-in and minor candidate notes: In 1998, write-ins received 772 votes. In 2010, independent and write-in candidates received 2,210 votes.

See also

 List of African-American United States representatives
 List of Asian Americans and Pacific Islands Americans in the United States Congress

References

External links

Congressman Bobby Scott official U.S. House website
Bobby Scott for Congress

|-

|-

|-

|-

|-

1947 births
Living people
21st-century American politicians
20th-century American lawyers
21st-century American lawyers
20th-century American politicians
African-American members of the United States House of Representatives
Asian-American members of the United States House of Representatives
African-American state legislators in Virginia
American politicians of Filipino descent
Articles containing video clips
Asian-American people in Virginia politics
Boston College Law School alumni
Democratic Party members of the United States House of Representatives from Virginia
Groton School alumni
Harvard College alumni
Massachusetts National Guard personnel
Members of the United States Congress of Filipino descent
Democratic Party members of the Virginia House of Delegates
Politicians from Washington, D.C.
Politicians from Newport News, Virginia
Virginia lawyers
Democratic Party Virginia state senators
United States Army soldiers
United States Army reservists
20th-century African-American politicians
21st-century African-American politicians